Alfredo Carlos Botelho Machado (3 June 1953 – 25 September 2012) was an international freestyle swimmer from Brazil, who competed at one Summer Olympics for his native country.

He began swimming for Fluminense and then moved to Flamengo.

He was at the 1971 Pan American Games, in Cali, where he won a bronze medal in the 4×200-metre freestyle, breaking the South American record. He also finished 5th in the 400-metre freestyle, 5th in the 400-metre individual medley (breaking the Brazilian record with a time of 4:54.7), 7th in the 200-metre freestyle and 8th in the 1500-metre freestyle.

At the 1972 Summer Olympics, in Munich, he swam the 200-metre freestyle, 400-metre freestyle, 1500-metre freestyle, and the 4×200-metre freestyle, not reaching the finals. He broke the Brazilian record in the 1500-metre freestyle in Munich. 

At the 1973 Summer Universiade, in Moscow, Machado won a bronze medal in the 4×200-metre freestyle, along with José Namorado, James Huxley Adams and José Aranha.

He died at age 59.

References

External links 
 
 

1953 births
2012 deaths
Brazilian male freestyle swimmers
Brazilian male medley swimmers
Swimmers at the 1971 Pan American Games
Swimmers at the 1972 Summer Olympics
Olympic swimmers of Brazil
Pan American Games bronze medalists for Brazil
Pan American Games medalists in swimming
Universiade medalists in swimming
Universiade bronze medalists for Brazil
Medalists at the 1973 Summer Universiade
Medalists at the 1971 Pan American Games
Swimmers from Rio de Janeiro (city)
20th-century Brazilian people
21st-century Brazilian people